Håkon Andreas Christie (30 August 1922 – 14 December 2010) was a Norwegian architectural historian, antiquarian and author. Together with his wife, Sigrid Marie Christie (18 April 1923 - 16  May 2004) he worked from 1950 on the history of Norwegian church architecture, particularly stave churches. Their research resulted in Norges Kirker which consisted of seven major volumes covering  churches in Østfold, Akershus and Buskerud.

Biography
Christie was born at Nannestad in Akershus, Norway. He was the son of Hartvig Caspar Christie (1893-1959) and his wife  Elisabeth Theodora Stabell (1898-1977). His father was a Provost  who supervised Church of Norway parishes in Akershus  including  Østre Bærum, Høvik, Asker  and Nannestad. He participated in the resistance during Nazi occupation of Norway  and in 1945 he entered the Norwegian Institute of Technology in Trondheim, where he graduated in 1949.

As a student, he worked as assistant to the architect Gerhard Fischer. He continued as an assistant to Fischer from 1950 and was hired as building historical consultant / research fellow at the Norwegian Directorate for Cultural Heritage project on Norwegian churches. From 1970, he was an antiquarian until he retired in 1991. He was a researcher from 1994 at the Norwegian Institute for Cultural Heritage Research.

Håkon  Christie was  a member of the Norwegian Academy of Science and Letters and the Society of Antiquaries of Scotland. He was appointed a Knight of the 1st Class in the Order of St Olaf and was awarded the Grosch medal, Urnes Medal and Europa Nostra award.

Sigrid Marie Bing Christie graduated from the University of Oslo in 1949 with a master's degree in art history. From 1950 to 1970, she was a research fellow with the Norwegian Research Council. She was a member of the Liturgy Commission of 1965 (Liturgikommisjonen av 1965) which undertake a comprehensive revision of the Liturgy of the Church of Norway.  She was  employed in the National Archives (Riksantivar)  from 1970. In 1974, she earned her Ph.D. She was a co-editor of the Norwegian Artists Lexicon (Norsk kunstnerleksikon) from 1978 to 1986. In 1988 Sigrid Christie became a knight of St. Olav's Order and in 1999 she received the  Urnes medal (Urnes-medaljen).

Sigrid  Christie died in 2004 and  Håkon Christie in 2010. Both Håkon and Sigrid  Christie were buried in the churchyard of Ullern Church in the district of Ullern in Oslo.

Selected works
Christie, Håkon & Sigrid (1959) Norges kirker
Christie, Håkon & Sigrid (1969)  Norges kirker Akershus 
Christie, Håkon  (1974)  Middelalderen bygger i tre (Oslo: Universitetsforlaget) 
 Christie, Håkon (1981) Stavkirkene – Arkitektur i Norges kunsthistorie   (Oslo: Universitetsforlaget)   
Christie, Håkon  (2009) Urnes stavkirke : den nåværende kirken på Urnes  (Oslo: Pax forlag)

References

Related reading
Christie, Sigrid and Håkon  (1981)  Norges kirker (Oslo: Gyldendal) 
Christie, Sigrid  (1973) Den lutherske ikonografi i Norge inntil 1800 (Oslo: Land og kirke)

External links
Norges Kirker website
Drawings by Håkon Christie

1922 births
2010 deaths
People from Nannestad
Architects from Oslo
Norwegian architectural historians
Norwegian Institute of Technology alumni
Norwegian antiquarians
Members of the Norwegian Academy of Science and Letters
Recipients of the St. Olav's Medal
Norwegian resistance members